Chuck E. Cheese (formerly known as Chuck E. Cheese's Pizza Time Theatre, Chuck E. Cheese's Pizza and simply Chuck E. Cheese's) is an American children’s family entertainment center (which also serves pizza) chain founded in 1977 by Atari's co-founder Nolan Bushnell. Headquartered in Irving, Texas, each location features arcade games, amusement rides and musical shows in addition to serving pizza and other food items; former mainstays included ball pits, crawl tubes, and animatronic shows. The chain's name is taken from its main character and mascot, Chuck E. Cheese. The first location opened as Chuck E. Cheese's Pizza Time Theatre in San Jose, California. It was the first family restaurant to integrate food with arcade games and animated entertainment.

After filing for bankruptcy in 1984, the chain was acquired in 1985 by Brock Hotel Corporation, parent company of competitor ShowBiz Pizza Place. The merger formed a new parent company, ShowBiz Pizza Time, Inc. which began unifying the two brands in 1990, renaming every location Chuck E. Cheese's Pizza. It was later shortened to Chuck E. Cheese's in 1994, and Chuck E. Cheese in 2019. Parent company ShowBiz Pizza Time also became CEC Entertainment in 1998.

History

Chuck E. Cheese's Pizza Time Theatre was founded by Atari founder Nolan Bushnell, who sought to expand video-game arcades beyond adult locations like pool halls to family friendly venues. His experience in the amusement park industry, and his fondness for Disneyland's Country Bear Jamboree, influenced his concept for Pizza Time Theatre. He has said, "It was my pet project ... I chose pizza because of the wait time and the build schedule—very few components, and not too many ways to screw it up." 

Prior to founding Atari, Bushnell would drive around the Bay Area with Atari co-founder Ted Dabney looking at different pizza parlors and restaurants to brainstorm concepts. "Chuck E. Cheese was always his (Nolan's) passion project, even before Atari was a thing," said Dabney. "He wanted to start a business of family-friendly restaurants with amusement park midway games. I think initially it made no fiscal sense, so he shelved it for a while, but then when Atari took off, he had the means to pursue it, plus a built-in distribution model for Atari's new releases."

When his first animatronic show was being assembled, Bushnell learned the costume he had bought for his main character, a coyote, was actually a rat, prompting him to suggest changing the name from "Coyote Pizza" to "Rick Rat's Pizza". His marketing team believed this name would not be appealing to customers and proposed "Chuck E. Cheese" instead. The company adopted the rat as their mascot.

The first Chuck E. Cheese's Pizza Time Theater opened in San Jose, California, in 1977. In 1978, when Atari's then-corporate parent Warner Communications refused to open additional locations, Bushnell purchased the rights to the concept and characters from Warner for $500,000. Gene Landrum then resigned from Atari and was made the restaurants' president and chief operating officer. By the end of December 1979, there were seven PTT locations, 6 in California and 1 in Nevada (Sparks). Its animatronics were produced fully in-house by PTT employees.

ShowBiz Pizza Place

To expand beyond California and the west coast, Bushnell began to franchise, resulting in a co-development agreement between himself and Robert Brock of Topeka Inn Management in June 1979. The agreement handed Brock exclusive franchising rights for opening Pizza Time Theatres in sixteen states across the Southern and Midwestern United States, while also forming a company subdivision, "Pizza Show Biz", to develop the Pizza Time Theatres.

Late in 1979, Brock became aware of Aaron Fechter of Creative Engineering, Inc. and his work in animatronics. In November 1979, he scouted Fechter's business and concluded that Creative Engineering's animatronics would be too strong a competition for Bushnell's work. Brock therefore requested that Bushnell release him from their co-development agreement, wishing to develop with Fechter instead. 

In December 1979 Brock and Fechter formed ShowBiz Pizza Place Inc., and Brock gave notice to sever his development relationship with Bushnell. ShowBiz Pizza Place was conceptually identical to Pizza Time Theatre in all aspects except for animation, which would be provided by Creative Engineering. ShowBiz Pizza Place opened its first location on March 3, 1980, in Kansas City, Missouri.

Upon the opening of ShowBiz Pizza Place, Bushnell sued Brock and Topeka Inn Management over breach of contract. Brock immediately issued a counter-suit against Bushnell, citing misrepresentation. The court case began in March 1980, eventually settling out of court with Showbiz agreeing to pay Pizza Time Theatre a portion of its profits over the following decade. During this period, Topeka Inn Management changed its name to Brock Hotel Corporation and moved its headquarters to Irving, Texas. Both restaurants experienced increased success as the video game industry became more robust. To maintain competition, both franchises continually modified and diversified their animatronic shows.

Mergers and restructuring

In 1981, Pizza Time Theatre went public; they lost $15 million in 1983. By early 1984, Bushnell's debts were insurmountable, resulting in the filing of Chapter 11 bankruptcy for Pizza Time Theatre Inc. on March 28, 1984. Brock then bought the floundering company, finalizing the purchase in May 1985 and merging the two restaurant companies into ShowBiz Pizza Time Inc.

After the merger, both restaurant chains continued operating under their respective titles, while major financial restructuring had begun. During this period, Creative Engineering began to sever ties with ShowBiz Pizza Time (officially splitting in September 1990), resulting in the unification of the two brands. By 1992, all restaurants assumed the name of Chuck E. Cheese's Pizza. The name was then shortened to Chuck E. Cheese's by March 1994 after a redesigned concept. 

In 1998, ShowBiz Pizza Time renamed itself CEC Entertainment, Inc. to reflect the remaining chain brand. CEC Entertainment has since acquired additional family restaurant properties, including 13 locations of the now-defunct Discovery Zone in 1999, and all locations of Peter Piper Pizza in October 2014. Peter Piper Pizza still operates under that name.

International expansion
In the early 1980s, the restaurant franchise debuted in Australia under the name Charlie Cheese's Pizza Playhouse. The name change had to do with the common meaning of the word "chuck", which in Australia is a reference to the phrase "to throw up". Consecutively, Pizza Time Theatre, Inc. also opened at least one restaurant in Hong Kong and Singapore, which both closed shortly thereafter as a result of the initial company's 1984 bankruptcy., Pizza Time Theatre also opened a location in Creteil, France in 1984, and planned to open a location in Ealing, England in the mid '80s, but the plan fell through. In 1999, CEC Entertainment, Inc. planned to open a CEC in Tokyo, Japan, but it too fell through. In 2022, it was announced that the first Chuck E. Cheese in Egypt would open in Sheik Zayed's Royal Mall, although it has not opened yet as of February 2023.

In February 2023, a third Chuck E. Cheese location opened in Port of Spain, Trinidad & Tobago, after the Chaguanas location in 2014, and the San Fernando location in 2016, although the San Fernando location closed sometime in January 2023.

Currently, Chuck E. Cheese locations are planned to open in Jamaica in late 2023, Guyana in 2024, and another in Jamaica by 2025, as well as a store in Romania, although it is unknown when that store will open.

As of February 2023, Chuck E. Cheese operated 569 corporate and franchised locations, as well as 122 Peter Piper Pizza restaurants. They are located in 47 states across the United States and in 17 countries and territories around the world.

Buyout and modern redesign
By 2012, CEC was struggling with decreasing revenue. They ran a rebranding campaign, changing the rat mascot into a rock star guitar-playing mouse. In-store restaurant sales continued to decline through 2013 but merchandising and box office revenue increased.

In February 2014, Apollo Global Management acquired CEC Entertainment, Inc. for $54 per share, or about $950 million. In October 2014, under Apollo Global Management, CEC Entertainment announced that they would purchase their Phoenix-based competitor, Peter Piper Pizza from ACON Investments.

In August 2017, the company began to pilot a new design concept at seven remodeled locations (three in Kansas City, three in San Antonio, one in Selma, Texas), branded as Chuck E. Cheese Pizzeria & Games. These locations feature more upscale decor with a "muted" interior color scheme, an open kitchen, the "Play Pass" card system to replace arcade tokens, and the animatronic stage show replaced by a dance floor area. These changes, along with expansions to food offerings, were intended to help the chain be more appealing to adults and encourage family dining as opposed to primarily hosting parties.

In 2019, the corporation announced it would go public on the New York Stock Exchange through a shell company, Leo Holdings Corporation, of which Apollo will still own 51%. Bloomberg  also reported that after going public, Chuck E. Cheese would no longer have animatronic animals as part of the entertainment. The proposed merger between CEC Entertainment and Leo Holdings Corporation was terminated on July 29, 2019.

Financial trouble
The COVID-19 pandemic has been financially damaging to the parent company, and with an estimated $1–2 billion in debt, the possibility exists of all CEC properties being forced to close if bankruptcy refinancing fails. CEC Entertainment solicited $200 million in loans to finance a restructuring under bankruptcy protection. They also filed a voluntary petition under Chapter 11 of the Bankruptcy Code in the United States Bankruptcy Court for the Southern District of Texas on June 25, 2020. CEC Entertainment, the owners of Chuck E. Cheese and Peter Piper Pizza chains, emerged from its June bankruptcy under the ownership selling of its lenders led by Monarch Alternative Capital.

Entertainment

Video arcade

Since the company's inception, one of the primary draws for the business has been its video arcade offering inside restaurants. Within the arcade, customers can play coin-operated video games or redemption games, the latter of which involves games of skill that reward players in the form of tickets based on score. Tickets can be redeemed later for merchandise, such as candy and toys.

The coin-op games originally accepted brass tokens issued by the company, stamped with various logos and branding that evolved over time. The company experimented with a card access method as a replacement for tokens, which allowed customers to load credits onto a card that could then be swiped for access at arcade games and refilled later. It was tested under different names including "Chuck E.'s Super Discount Card" and "Chuck E. Token Card".

Characters and animatronics

Another primary draw for the centers since their beginning through to the mid-2010s has been its animatronic shows. There have historically been several different styles of animatronic shows in use within the company, details of which would vary depending on when the location opened, whether it was renovated, available room for animatronic stages, and other factors. Over the years, these animatronics have often been supplemented by (and in recent years been completely replaced by) costumed characters.

When the first location opened in 1977, the animatronic characters were featured as busts in framed portraits hanging on the walls of the main dining area. The original show featured Crusty The Cat (the first character to face retirement as he was soon replaced with Mr. Munch in 1978), Pasqually the singing chef, Jasper T. Jowls, the Warblettes, and the main focus of the show, Chuck E. Cheese. By 1979, many restaurants had also added "Cabaret" shows in separate rooms of each restaurant. One of the early Cabaret characters was Dolli Dimples, a hippopotamus who played the piano and sang in the blues/jazz style of performer Pearl Bailey. The in-house control system consisted of a 6502-based controller in a card cage with various driver boards was called "Cyberamics".

While Fechter separately produced the Rock-afire Explosion animatronics for ShowBiz Pizza through the early 1980s, Bushnell and Pizza Time Theatre continued work on characters for their portrait format and newer balcony performance stage shows under the umbrella of the Pizza Time Players. Development on Cabaret concepts slowed greatly after Pizza Time Theatre Inc.'s bankruptcy in 1984 and its purchase by ShowBiz a year later. From 1985 to 1990, the merged company kept their brands (and their respective animatronics) mostly separate.

After Fechter refused to sign over the rights to the Rock-afire Explosion to Showbiz Pizza Time, Inc., "Concept Unification" was undertaken beginning in September 1990 and continuing through 1992, to eliminate Fechter's characters from ShowBiz locations. The animatronics used for ShowBiz's Rock-afire Explosion band was redressed as "Munch's Make Believe Band", with new costumes. In the mid-1990s, the character Chuck E. Cheese began to see significant design changes. His vest (or suit) and derby hat were changed for a baseball cap, casual shirt, and optional sneakers in an attempt to appeal to a younger audience.

Beginning in 1998, the animatronics show was installed in new stores, referred to as "Studio C", consisting of a single animated Chuck E. Cheese character created by Garner Holt alongside large television monitors, lighting effects, and interactive elements. The other characters appear as puppets on the TV screens. The control system dubbed "Cyberstar" was redesigned from the ground up and produced by Dave Philipsen. The last non-animatronic stage mass-produced for Chuck E. Cheese, "Circles of Light", premiered in early 2012.

For stores still featuring animatronics, updated programs for the character are generally distributed on DVD, but for Studio C SD (Studio C Alpha, Beta, and Cappa stages) locations, they continue to use 3 DVDs and a 3.5 inch floppy disk.

In mid-2022, A new system for running the animatronic shows (3-Stage, Cyberamics, and all Studio C SD and HD shows) was introduced that would, instead of using physical media such as DVDs, function using the store's Wi-Fi connection. The implementation of said device caused a problem for the Studio C shows, as their previous show system(s) had special file formats for programming signals, therefore the switch to the new system would cause no animatronic movements to happen, except for a "Random Movements" program. The Munch's Make Believe Band stages (3-Stage, Road Stage, 2-Stage, 1-Stage, CU 1-Stage, and the Lynnwood, Washington location's "Cyberamic 3-Stage") were not affected by this change of systems.

Elimination of animatronics
In July 2012, the long-standing rat mascot was rebranded, changing to a slimmer rock star mouse who plays electric guitar. Voice actor Duncan Brannan, who for 19 years had characterized Chuck E. Cheese as a wise-cracking rat from New Jersey, was replaced with Jaret Reddick, the frontman and guitarist for the pop punk band Bowling for Soup.

By 2015, the "Chuck E. Live Stage" also known as "Stage V2", which featured no animatronics at all, a modernized dance floor, and performances only with costumed characters, had been created. In 2017, the chain announced that animatronic shows would be removed entirely in favor of this design in seven pilot locations. After the pilot locations showed promise, retirement of animatronics at Chuck E. Cheese locations accelerated and continued through 2019, by which time 80 of its stores were expected to be retrofitted to the new design.

Food
Pizza is the main focus of the restaurant portion of the business, but the menu features other items as well including cold-cut sandwiches, chicken wings, salad bar access, and desserts. In addition, some Chuck E. Cheese locations offer alcoholic beverages.

In March 2020, during the COVID-19 pandemic, the restaurant began selling pizza, wings, desserts and more through food delivery services under the ghost kitchen Pasqually's Pizza & Wings. The Pasqually name comes from Pasqually P. Pieplate, who is a member of Munch's Make Believe Band, the Chuck E Cheese animatronic band. While food sold under this brand comes from the same brick-and-mortar kitchens as Chuck E. Cheese, the company claims to use different ingredients and recipes that cater to a more mature audience. Practically all of the Chuck E. Cheese stores in the United States are selling and delivering food under this virtual brand.

In November 2022, a partnership started between CEC Entertainment and LankyBox, which is an American Roblox YouTube channel, for a delivery only service known as "LankyBox Kitchen", which serves pizza, mac and cheese, chicken wings, salads, french fries, and desserts. LankyBox Kitchen locations are based out of Chuck E. Cheese kitchens.

References

External links

 

1977 establishments in California
1977 in robotics
1980s fads and trends
2014 mergers and acquisitions
2020 mergers and acquisitions
Animatronic attractions
Apollo Global Management companies
Atari
Companies based in Irving, Texas
Companies based in San Jose, California
Companies formerly listed on the New York Stock Exchange
Companies that filed for Chapter 11 bankruptcy in 1984
Companies that filed for Chapter 11 bankruptcy in 2020
Entertainment companies established in 1977
Fast-food franchises
Pizza chains of Canada
Pizza chains of the United States
Pizza franchises
Restaurant chains in the United States
Restaurants established in 1977
Theme restaurants
Video arcades